Leonardo Andrés Olivera Troncoso (born 8 June 1987) is a Chilean footballer who last played for Cobreloa in his home country.

Career

Olivera started his senior career with Unión Quilpué. In 2010, he signed for C.D. Cobreloa in the Chilean Primera División, where he made five appearances and scored zero goals. After that, he played for Vasalunds IF, San Luis de Quillota, Unión San Felipe,  CD Magallanes, Deportes Iberia, Sitra Club, Curicó Unido, San Marcos de Arica, Deportes Valdivia, and Deportes Melipilla.

References

External links 
 
 Leonardo Olivera at playmakerstats.com (English version of ceroacero.es)
 
 
 
 

Living people
1987 births
Footballers from Santiago
Chilean footballers
Chilean expatriate footballers
Deportes Temuco footballers
C.F. Pachuca players
Everton de Viña del Mar footballers
Naval de Talcahuano footballers
Cobreloa footballers
Vasalunds IF players
San Luis de Quillota footballers
Unión San Felipe footballers
Deportes Magallanes footballers
Magallanes footballers
Deportes Iberia footballers
Sitra Club players
Curicó Unido footballers
San Marcos de Arica footballers
Deportes Valdivia footballers
Deportes Melipilla footballers
Cobresal footballers
Liga MX players
Chilean Primera División players
Primera B de Chile players
Segunda División Profesional de Chile players
Ettan Fotboll players
Bahraini Premier League players
Chilean expatriate sportspeople in Mexico
Chilean expatriate sportspeople in Sweden
Chilean expatriate sportspeople in Bahrain
Expatriate footballers in Mexico
Expatriate footballers in Sweden
Expatriate footballers in Bahrain
Association football forwards